Alibeyli (literally "place of Ali Bey"), also spelled Əlibəyli or Alibayli or Alıbəyli, is a Turkic place name and may refer to several places:

Azerbaijan
Alıbəyli, Agdam
Alıbəyli, Zangilan
Əlibəyli, Qakh
Əlibəyli, Tovuz
Əlibəyli, Zardab

Turkey
 Alibeyli, Erdemli, Mersin Province
 Alibeyli, Kalecik, Ankara Province
 Alibeyli, Tarsus, Mersin Province

See also
 Alibey (disambiguation)
 Alibeyce, Emirdağ, Turkish village with a similar name

Turkish toponyms